Roberto Monteiro, commonly known by the nickname Roberto Batata (July 24, 1949 – May 13, 1976), was an association football forward who played for several Campeonato Brasileiro Série A club Cruzeiro and for the Brazil national team.

Nickname
Batata's nickname, meaning Roberto Potato, was given by the head coach João Crispim, because of his love for French fries (known in Brazil as batata frita).

Club career
Born in Belo Horizonte, capital of the state of Minas Gerais, Roberto Batata started his professional career playing for América-MG, leaving the club to join Cruzeiro in 1969. Defending Cruzeiro, he won the Campeonato Mineiro in 1969, 1972, 1973, 1974 and in 1975, and the Copa Libertadores in 1976. He played 90 Série A games for his club, scoring 24 goals. Including other competition games, he played 281 games for Cruzeiro, and scored 110 goals.

International career
Roberto Batata played six Copa América games in 1975, scoring three goals. His first game was played on July 31, against Venezuela. He scored his first two goals for the national team against that same country, on August 13. His third goal was scored on September 30, against Peru. His last game for the national team was played on October 4, against Peru.

Death
Batata died on May 13, 1976, in Belo Horizonte, after a car crash at Rodovia Fernão Dias when he was traveling to Três Corações to visit his wife Denize and his eleven-month son Leonardo. The accident happened one day after he played his last game for Cruzeiro, in which he helped his team beat Alianza Lima of Peru 4–0, scoring one of the goals.
 Roberto Batata is buried in Cemitério Bonfim - Belo Horizonte, Minas Gerais

References

1949 births
1976 deaths
Brazilian footballers
Brazil international footballers
América Futebol Clube (MG) players
Cruzeiro Esporte Clube players
Association football forwards
1975 Copa América players
Road incident deaths in Brazil
Footballers from Belo Horizonte